The Romance of a Movie Star is a 1920 British silent romance film directed by Richard Garrick and starring Violet Hopson, Stewart Rome and Gregory Scott. It is based on the novel The World's Best Girl by Coralie Stanton.

Plot
A film star risks her reputation to help out a friend.

Cast
 Violet Hopson as Vanna George  
 Stewart Rome as Garry Slade  
 Gregory Scott as Robert Arkwright  
 Mercy Hatton as Cynthia Justice  
 Cameron Carr as Philip Justice  
 Violet Elliott as Mrs. Slade

References

Bibliography
 Low, Rachael. History of the British Film, 1918-1929. George Allen & Unwin, 1971.

External links

1920 films
1920s romance films
British silent films
British romance films
Films directed by Richard Garrick
Films based on British novels
British black-and-white films
1920s English-language films
1920s British films
English-language romance films